Halls Crossroads is an unincorporated community in south central Franklin County, North Carolina, United States. 

It is located north of Bunn, at an elevation of 302 feet (92 m). The primary cross roads where the community is located are: N.C. Highway 39, Pearces Road (SR 1001) and Ferrells Bridge Road (SR 1001).

References

Unincorporated communities in Franklin County, North Carolina
Unincorporated communities in North Carolina